Shirota is a Japanese surname. Notable people with the surname include:

 Yuu Shirota (or Shirota Yuu, 城田優), Japanese actor and singer
 Minoru Shirota (代田稔 1899–1982) invented Yakult, the yogurt-like probiotic drink containing Lactobacillus casei strain shirota

Japanese-language surnames